Erayamkudy is a small village in the Thrissur District of the Kerala state of India. This village is in the shore of the Chalakudy River with an ancient temple Erayamkudy Bhagavathi Kshetram. The nearest villages are Mambra, Annamanada, Puliyanam and Elavoor. The village has a population of about 1000. The majority of people who live here mainly depend on coconut, rice, and nutmeg crop. The Village is Known For the Agitation of 2008 regarding the destruction of paddy fields. Various leaders like VS Achudanandan Visited the Protest. Erayamkudy is known for its Jaathikkathottam's (nutmeg plantations). Erayamkudy has also been a location for filming some scenes of the 2019 movie Thanneer Mathan Dinangal.

References 

Villages in Thrissur district